is a Japanese term for the Vajrayana practices of Shingon Buddhism and the related practices that make up part of the Tendai and Kegon schools. There are also Shingon and Tendai influenced practices of Shugendō.

Mikkyō is a "lineage tradition": meaning that, as well as instruction in the teachings and practices of the tradition, it involves and requires "kanjo enablements" (initiatorial empowerment-transmissions) from a master of the Mikkyō disciplines.

The collection of teachings and practices that eventually came to be known as Mikkyō had its early beginnings in the esoteric traditions of India and China. As early as the 6th century, there had begun a major importation of spiritual and cultural ideas into Japan from China. However, in the early 9th century the formative concepts which would become the core of "mainstream" Mikkyo—Shingon and Tendai—were brought to Japan, initially by the monks Kūkai (the founder of Shingon) and Saichō (the founder of Tendai), both of whom had traveled to China to study.

To these initial doctrines and beliefs were later added teachings concerning the powers of mysticism, magic and healing that had gradually begun to reach Japan with the arrival of itinerant monks, priests, hermits and shamanic practitioners, forced to flee from China after the fall of the Tang dynasty.

Blending easily with elements of Shinto practice and the pre-Buddhist folk traditions of sangaku-shinkō ("spiritual practices connected with sacred mountains"), these imported teachings, combining Chinese Esoteric Buddhism, Onmyōdō, Taoism and, at a later date, Tibetan Buddhism, evolved to become the esoteric Japanese tradition that is Mikkyō.

See also
Godai (Japanese philosophy)

References

Buddhism in Japan
Vajrayana